Louise Fusil (1771-1848), was a French stage actor and memoir writer.  She is known for her memoirs, describing her life during the French revolution.   Her memoirs describe her life in exile in the Austrian Netherlands, Scotland and Russia during the Reign of Terror.

References

1771 births
1848 deaths
French memoirists
People of the French Revolution
18th-century French actresses
18th-century memoirists
18th-century travel writers